Wagons East (sometimes stylised as Wagons East!) is a 1994 American Western adventure comedy film directed by Peter Markle and starring John Candy and Richard Lewis. The film was released in the United States on August 26, 1994. Filming took place in Sierra de Órganos National Park in the town of Sombrerete, Mexico, and in Durango, Mexico.

During the final days of the film's production in Durango, Mexico, John Candy died of a heart attack at the age of 43. Script re-writes, a stand-in and special effects were used to complete his remaining scenes, and it was released five months after his death. The film marked Candy's penultimate performance.

As well as being one of John Candy's final performances, this is also the last Carolco Pictures production to be distributed by
TriStar Pictures. The film was panned by critics with the rare 0% rating on Rotten Tomatoes. The film grossed $4.4 million at the box office.

Plot
In the 1860s Wild West, a group of misfit settlers, including ex-doctor Phil Taylor, prostitute Belle, and gay bookseller Julian Rogers, decide they cannot live in their current situation in the west, so they hire a grizzled alcoholic wagon master by the name of James Harlow to take them on a journey back to their hometowns in the East.

Comedic exploits ensue as the drunken wagon master lets his horse choose the correct fork in the road, leads them to a dried out watering hole, and eventually guides them into Sioux territory where they are captured. The Chief, however, is sympathetic to the idea of 'white men heading back east', and offers an escort off Sioux land. Meanwhile, they must also contend with (inept) hired gunslingers who have been sent by railroad magnates to stop the journey, as they fear the bad publicity it could create for the settlers about to commence a 'land rush' into the west.

Harlow's secret, that he had been wagon master for the infamous Donner Party, eventually comes out, and the group confront Harlow about his past; he chooses to walk away from the group and they proceed on their own. As he resumes his drinking at the closest tavern, he overhears that the cavalry will be confronting the group the following day, and intends to wipe them out, as directed by the head of the railroad company.

As the cavalry arrives the next day, and the group 'square their wagons', Harlow rides in to the rescue and 'calls out' the cavalry leader to single combat. After a drawn out and comical fight scene, Harlow is victorious, and the group celebrates. Harlow and Belle decide to pursue a relationship, Julian departs for somewhere 'even further west' (San Francisco) and the group rides toward the now visible St. Louis to finish the journey.

Cast

Production
Candy was contractually mandated to make this film due to his existing contract with Carolco Pictures from their scrapped John Hughes film Bartholomew v. Neff, which Candy was to star in with Sylvester Stallone. Despite his misgivings about the script, and due to the fact that he owed more than $1 million due to his stake as a minority owner with the Toronto Argonauts football team, Candy agreed to make Wagons East  in Durango, Mexico.

On March 4, 1994, Candy died of a heart attack in his sleep after finishing the day’s shooting. Following Candy's death, Carolco received an insurance payout of $15.3 million. The film was completed by using CGI, a body double and script rewrites to finish Candy’s remaining scenes.

Reception
The film was released five months after Candy's death and was a box-office bomb. On review aggregator website Rotten Tomatoes, with 30 reviews, the film has a rare approval rating of 0%meaning no favorable reviews whatsoeverreceiving an average rating of 2.9/10. The site's consensus describes the film as "a witless, toothless satire of Westerns that falls far below the standard set by Blazing Saddles, and is notable only for being John Candy's final screen performance."

Film critic Roger Ebert, who called the film "a sad way to end John Candy's career", stated that his legacy was already permanent and would survive this film. In the book The Comedy Film Nerds Guide to Movies, Wagons East! is listed at number one on its list of The Ten Worst Westerns.

Audiences polled by CinemaScore gave the film an average grade of "C−" on an A+ to F scale.

Year-end lists 
 6th worst– Robert Denerstein, Rocky Mountain News
 Top 18 worst (alphabetically listed, not ranked) – Michael Mills, The Palm Beach Post

See also
 List of films with a 0% rating on Rotten Tomatoes
 Almost Heroes

References

External links
 
 
 
 
 

1994 films
1990s adventure comedy films
1990s Western (genre) comedy films
American adventure comedy films
American Western (genre) comedy films
1990s English-language films
Films set in 1860
Films shot in Mexico
Carolco Pictures films
TriStar Pictures films
Artisan Entertainment films
Films directed by Peter Markle
Films scored by Michael Small
1994 comedy films
1990s American films